Tok Airport  was a state-owned public-use airport located two nautical miles (4 km) south of the central business district of Tok, in the Southeast Fairbanks Census Area of the U.S. state of Alaska.

Facilities and aircraft 
Tok Airport has one runway designated 13/31 with a 1,690 by 45 ft (515 x 14 m) gravel and turf surface. For the 12-month period ending December 31, 2005, the airport had 600 aircraft operations, an average of 50 per month: 83% general aviation and 17% air taxi. At that time there were 17 aircraft based at this airport, all single-engine.

Other airports in Tok 
It has one runway designated 7/25 with a 2,509 x 50 ft (765 x 15 m) asphalt surface.
It has one runway designated 10/28 with a 2,035 x 80 ft (620 x 24 m) gravel surface.

References

External links 

 Aerial photo of Tok (TKJ) and Tok 2 (8AK9) (JPG). Federal Aviation Administration, Alaska Region. Summer 1975.
 Airport diagram of Tok (TKJ) and Tok 2 (8AK9) (GIF). Federal Aviation Administration, Alaska Region. September 2004.
 Topographic map showing Tok and landing strip to the south. USGS The National Map via MSR Maps. July 1948.
 

Defunct airports in Alaska
Airports in the Southeast Fairbanks Census Area, Alaska